Fides Benini (9 September 1929 – 11 April 1993) was an Italian swimmer. She competed in the women's 4 × 100 metre freestyle relay at the 1952 Summer Olympics.

References

1929 births
1993 deaths
Olympic swimmers of Italy
Swimmers at the 1952 Summer Olympics
Sportspeople from Trieste
Italian female freestyle swimmers